The European Esperanto Union (EEU) is a union of the national Esperanto associations of the European Union member states. It holds congresses every two years. The congress in Maribor, Slovenia, in July and August 2007, attracted 256 delegates from 28 countries, including two members of the European Parliament, Małgorzata Handzlik of Poland and Ljudmila Novak of Slovenia.

In December 2009, the EEU ran a full-page advertisement in the French newspaper Le Monde advocating the use of Esperanto instead of English. , Seán Ó Riain is the president of the EEU.

References

External links
 
 About the EEU (in Esperanto) on website of the UEA
 Irish Times - Tongues are loosened at Esperanto conference in Galway
  EUROPO -  Eŭropa Esperanto-Unio
 Poliglotti4.eu - EEU - Eŭropa Esperanto-Unio

Esperanto organizations
International organizations based in Europe